The Taipei Metro Xihu station is located in the Neihu District in Taipei, Taiwan. It is a station on Wenhu line and opened on 4 July 2009.

Station overview 

This three-level, elevated station features an island platform, two exits, and a platform elevator located on the east side of the concourse level. Unlike other stations on Brown Line, the concourse of this station is located above the platform level.

On the eastern and northern walls of the station is a public art display. Titled "Crossing-Transformation", the aluminum and pottery brick piece can be perceived differently if viewed from different angles.

Notably, this is the only non-terminus elevated station on the Wenhu line that features trains opening its doors on the left rather than on the right.

History 
22 February 2009: Xihu station construction is completed.
4 July 2009: Begins service with the opening of Brown Line.

Station layout

Nearby Places 
 Xihu Market
 Neihu Technology Park
 Takming University of Science and Technology
 Xihu Junior High School
 Xihu Elementary School
 Meiti Riverside Park
 BenQ's headquarters

References 

Wenhu line stations
Railway stations opened in 2009